In the United Kingdom, the term listed building refers to a building or other structure officially designated as being of special architectural, historical, or cultural significance; Grade I structures are those considered to be "buildings of exceptional interest". Listing was begun by a provision in the Town and Country Planning Act 1947. Once listed, strict limitations are imposed on the modifications allowed to a building's structure or fittings. In Wales, the authority for listing under the Planning (Listed Buildings and Conservation Areas) Act 1990 rests with Cadw.

Buildings

|}

See also

 Listed buildings in Wales
Grade I listed buildings in Monmouthshire
Grade I listed buildings in Cardiff
Grade I listed buildings in Caerphilly
Grade I listed buildings in Torfaen
Grade II* listed buildings in Newport
Scheduled Monuments in Newport
Registered historic parks and gardens in Newport

Notes

References

External links

 
Newport I